Frostville is an unincorporated community located in the town of Maple Valley, Oconto County, Wisconsin, United States. The community was named for Andrew C. Frost, who established a general store in the community in 1880.

Notes

Unincorporated communities in Oconto County, Wisconsin
Unincorporated communities in Wisconsin